Cedarsong Nature School is an early education nature immersion program based on the German forest kindergarten model. The students are children ages 2–6 and the curriculum is based on interaction with the environment and establishing a connection to the natural world through play. The school is located on a five-acre campus on Vashon Island, Washington and serves the Greater Seattle area.

Cedarsong Forest Kindergarten is based on 10 key principles:

  Total nature immersion (regardless of weather)
  Interest-led flow learning
  Reggio-inspired emergency curriculum
  Place-based education
  Inquiry-based teaching
  Positive reinforcement
  Emphasis on individual empowerment and group bonding
  Respect for others, self, and the living earth
  Small class sizes
  Low teacher:student ratio

References 

 
 
  November/December 2010

External links
 

Schools in King County, Washington